Fort Capon or Fort Enoch was a stockade fort erected in 1756 by the Virginia colonial militia located at the confluence of the North River and the Cacapon near present-day Forks of Cacapon in Hampshire County, West Virginia.  The site of Fort Capon can be reached off of Gaston Road from WV 29 or WV 127 (Bloomery Pike).

The construction of the original stockade was ordered by George Washington and erected by troops in the Virginia Colonial Militia during the winter of 1756 and had been completed by the spring of 1757. On April 7, 1757, Washington ordered Captain John Mercer to lead his company of the Virginia Regiment to Fort Capon and to send out scouting parties as far as Berkeley Springs to determine if any French or Native Americans were present in the vicinity. On April 18, Captain Mercer engaged in a skirmish with Native Americans near Fort Edwards on the Cacapon River in present-day Capon Bridge where he and sixteen of his men were killed. It is located on the  Powell Farm.

Fort Capon was known by a number of names during its use. These names include: Fort Enoch, Enoch's Fort, Fort Capon, and Forks of Capon Stockade.

References

Capon
Capon
Capon